Dogs for Good is a UK-based charity training dogs to help adults and children with physical disabilities and learning disabilities, children with autism and adults with dementia. Until October 2015 it was called Dogs for the Disabled.

History
The charity was founded in 1988 by Frances Hay (1950–90) in Kenilworth, Warwickshire. This was as a result of Frances' personal experience with her own pet dog helping Frances overcome her own disability.

In 2000 a successful application to the National Lottery resulted in the building of a national training centre in Banbury, Oxfordshire where the charity is based today.

Dogs for Good is a fully Accredited Member of Assistance Dogs International (ADI) and meets the ADI standards in its assistance dog work.

Dogs for Good is a member of Assistance Dogs UK (ADUK). Assistance Dogs UK is a coalition of assistance dog charities all accredited by Assistance Dogs International.

Dogs for Good is a Full member of Animal Assisted Intervention International (AAII) and adheres to the AAII standards in its community dog work.

References

External links
https://www.dogsforgood.org/ Dogs for Good official website
https://aai-int.org/ Animal Assisted Intervention International website
https://assistancedogsinternational.org/ Assistance Dogs International website
http://www.assistancedogs.org.uk/ Assistance Dogs UK website

Assistance dogs
Autism-related organisations in the United Kingdom
Charities for disabled people based in the United Kingdom
Organisations based in Warwickshire